Mikuláš Tóth (born 15 March 1988) is a Slovak football defender who most recently played for FC Košice.

References

External links

 at mfkkosice.sk 

1988 births
Living people
Slovak footballers
Association football defenders
FC VSS Košice players
FC Lokomotíva Košice players
Slovak Super Liga players
Sportspeople from Košice